Żurowski is a Polish surname. Notable people with the surname include:

Adam Żurowski (1929–2016), Polish geodesist and academic
Agnes Zurowski (1920–2013), Canadian baseball player
Kazimierz Żurowski (1909–1987), Polish archaeologist
Maciej Żurowski (1915–2003), Polish historian
Teresa Zurowski (born 1956), Austrian handball player

Polish-language surnames